
Gmina Kołobrzeg is a rural gmina (administrative district) in Kołobrzeg County, West Pomeranian Voivodeship, in north-western Poland. Its seat is the town of Kołobrzeg, although the town is not part of the territory of the gmina.

Villages
Gmina Kołobrzeg contains the villages and settlements of Bezpraw, Błotnica, Bogucino, Bogusławiec, Budzimskie, Budzistowo, Drzonowo, Dźwirzyno, Głąb, Głowaczewo, Grzybowo, Kądzielno, Karcino, Kopydłówko, Korzyścienko, Korzystno, Niekanin, Nowogardek, Nowy Borek, Obroty, Przećmino, Przylaski, Rogozina, Samowo, Sarbia, Sieradowo, Sobiemierz, Stary Borek, Stramnica, Świerszczewo, Wólka and Zieleniewo.

Neighbouring gminas
Gmina Kołobrzeg is bordered by the town of Kołobrzeg and by the gminas of Dygowo, Gościno, Siemyśl, Trzebiatów and Ustronie Morskie.

References
Polish official population figures 2006

Kolobrzeg
Kołobrzeg County

de:Kołobrzeg#Landgemeinde Kołobrzeg (Gmina)